The Big North Conference is a high school athletic conference in New Jersey. It is one of six North Jersey "super athletic conferences" created by the New Jersey State Interscholastic Athletic Association (NJSIAA) in 2009. There are 41 member schools in the Big North Conference, with all members located in either Bergen County or Passaic County, New Jersey.

History

As high school athletics in New Jersey grew in the 1990s and 2000s, problems began to develop in the organization of leagues and conferences. Transportation costs began to grow, as some conferences had teams from as many as four different counties competing against each other. Other conferences were losing competitive balance, as a growth in non-public school enrollment and athletic programs caused tension between non-public and public schools, with public schools accusing non-public schools of recruiting. Conferences also demanded more flexibility in scheduling, as schools felt locked into league and division schedules against opponents either too weak or too strong for true competitive balance. 

The strongest tensions were found in the Northern New Jersey Interscholastic League, where public schools who were frustrated by the competitive imbalance with non-public schools, especially Don Bosco Preparatory (Ramsey) and Bergen Catholic (Oradell) in football or Immaculate Heart Academy (Township of Washington) in girls' athletics, threatened to secede from the league.

Therefore, in 2008 the NJSIAA established a "Leagues and Conferences Realignment Committee" to discuss the need for realigning conferences and leagues throughout New Jersey. Their original proposal for schools in northern New Jersey was the creation of six super conferences from the eleven conferences then in existence. While the original proposal was not accepted as presented, it was adjusted and schools realigned yet again, to create the current system in place in New Jersey athletics.

The current realignment started in the 2010–11 school year, after a one-year transition period, when many Big North members schools were part of the North Jersey Tri-County Conference. The NJSIAA had stated that the present system may only go into effect for two to three years, and after a review of the system, a reversion to the old conference alignment may be possible. Athletic Directors in the conference, however, voted in March 2011 to revise the division alignments within the conference for the 2012-2013 academic years and voted against the transfer of DePaul Catholic High School into the North Jersey Interscholastic Conference.  Pascack Hills High School initially changed its mind about leaving the NJIC to join the Big North, but subsequently asked to be admitted. The Cowboys became the 41st member of the conference to begin the 2012-13 school year.

Current schools

Bergen County Public Schools

Bergen County Non-Public Schools

Passaic County Public Schools

Passaic County Non-Public Schools

Sports Offered

Fall Sports

 Cross Country
 Field Hockey
 Football 
 Gymnastics
 Soccer
 Tennis (Girls)
 Volleyball (Girls)

Winter Sports 

 Basketball (Boys)
 Basketball (Girls)
 Bowling
 Cheerleading
 Ice Hockey
 Swimming
 Winter Track
 Wrestling

Spring Sports 

 Baseball
 Golf
 Lacrosse
 Softball
 Tennis (Boys)
 Track & Field
 Volleyball (Boys)

Conference Divisions: Football
As conference play started in the 2010 academic year, teams were split into six divisions for football purposes, seven divisions for every other sport. The hope in developing the division system is that the system will increase rivalries and promote competitive balance while minimizing travel time between schools within each division.

Division I (United)

Bergen Catholic
DePaul Catholic
Don Bosco Prep
Paramus Catholic
St. Joseph Regional

Division II (Liberty)

Clifton
Eastside (Paterson)
Fair Lawn
Kennedy (Paterson)
Passaic
Passaic County Technical Institute

Division III (Freedom)

Bergen Tech
Hackensack
Paramus
Ridgewood
Teaneck
Wayne Hills

Division IV (Independence)

Northern Valley-Old Tappan
Pascack Valley
Passaic Valley
Ramapo
Wayne Valley
West Milford

Division V (National)

Bergenfield
Indian Hills
Lakeland
Northern Highlands
Northern Valley-Demarest
Tenafly

Division VI (American)

Cliffside Park
Dumont
Dwight-Morrow (Englewood)
Fort Lee
Ridgefield Park

Conference Divisions: Other Sports

United Division

Academy of the Holy Angels
Bergen Catholic
DePaul Catholic
Don Bosco Prep
Immaculate Heart Academy
Paramus Catholic
St. Joseph Regional

: Girls' athletics only
: Boys' athletics only
: Co-Educational

Liberty Division

Bergen Tech
Clifton
Eastside (Paterson)
Kennedy (Paterson)
Passaic
Passaic County Technical Institute

Freedom Division

Hackensack
Indian Hills
Northern Highlands
Paramus
Ramapo
Ridgewood

Independence Division

Fair Lawn
Lakeland 
Passaic Valley
Wayne Hills
Wayne Valley
West Milford

National Division

Bergenfield
Northern Valley-Demarest
Northern Valley-Old Tappan
Pascack Valley
Teaneck
Tenafly

Patriot Division

Mahwah
Pascack Hills
Ramsey
River Dell
Westwood

American Division

Cliffside Park
Dumont
Dwight Morrow (Englewood)
Fort Lee
Ridgefield Park

References

External links
 Big North Conference Website
 Tom Bergeron (Newark Star-Ledger), "NJSIAA Realignment Plan: Six Super Conferences in North/Central Jersey" accessed September 25, 2010.
 League Affiliations of the New Jersey State Interscholastic Athletic Association for 2012-13

New Jersey high school athletic conferences
Sports in Bergen County, New Jersey
Passaic County, New Jersey